Abia Nale (born 5 October 1986 in Sebokeng, Gauteng) is a South African football player who plays as an attacking midfielder.

References

External links

1986 births
Living people
People from Sebokeng
South African soccer players
Association football midfielders
Association football forwards
Cape Town Spurs F.C. players
Kaizer Chiefs F.C. players
Lamontville Golden Arrows F.C. players
Manning Rangers F.C. players
Mpumalanga Black Aces F.C. players
Maritzburg United F.C. players
Platinum Stars F.C. players
South Africa international soccer players
Sportspeople from Gauteng